What Up, Dog? is a 1988 album by Was (Not Was). It became the group's breakthrough album worldwide and was ranked #99 on the Rolling Stone magazine's list of the 100 Best Albums of the 1980s. The cover illustration was credited to Christoph Simon and Karen Kelly.

Background
Success of What Up, Dog? was propelled by the group's two biggest hits: "Walk the Dinosaur" and "Spy in the House of Love" and four other singles. The former was promoted by a popular music video in which the band performed while a group of girls in campy cave girl costumes danced. The video received heavy rotation on MTV and MuchMusic and led the single into the top ten of the US singles chart in 1989. Artist/animator Christoph Simon created videos to accompany the tracks "What Up, Dog?", "Dad I'm in Jail" and the Tom Waits-style "Earth to Doris". These appeared on MTV's Liquid Television and in various film festivals, including the Spike & Mike festival.

The album had fewer guest vocalists than their previous album and instead was focused around the group's two lead singers, Sweet Pea Atkinson and Sir Harry Bowens. However, a typically long list of collaborators and guest musicians worked on the album including Elvis Costello (co-writer of "Shadow & Jimmy"), Marshall Crenshaw (co-writer of "Love Can Be Bad Luck"), and Frank Sinatra Jr. on "Wedding Vows in Vegas". It also included the second re-recording of the group's signature song: "Out Come the Freaks".

Release
What Up, Dog? became the group's breakthrough album in the US and worldwide. It reached #43 on the Billboard 200 album chart, #41 in New Zealand, and #47 in the UK. The album also spawned six singles (seven if the re-release of "Spy in the House of Love" is counted). The biggest hit was "Walk the Dinosaur" which charted worldwide and hit the top 10 in the US and UK. "Spy in the House of Love" was very popular too, hitting the top 20 in the US, #21 in the UK and peaking at #1 on the Billboard Hot Dance Club Play chart. "Anything Can Happen" was the third and final single to chart on the Billboard Hot 100 chart reaching #75. In the UK, "Robot Girl", "Boy's Gone Crazy" and "Out Come the Freaks" (alternately re-titled "Out Come the Freaks (Again)" and "(Stuck Inside Of Detroit With The) Out Come The Freaks (Again)") reached modest positions on the charts. In 1992, "Somewhere in America There's a Street Named After My Dad" was released as a single to promote the group's compilation Hello Dad...I'm in Jail.

US and International versions of the album featured different running orders and varying versions of the songs. Notably, "11 MPH" on the US edition was remixed and "Robot Girl" was a slightly different and shorter mix. The International CDs and LPs did not include David Was's jazzy monologue "Earth to Doris". LP versions in both countries do not include "Robot Girl", "Wedding Vows in Vegas" and "I Can't Turn You Loose", but have differing running orders.

Reception

In 1989, it was ranked #99 on Rolling Stone magazine's list of the 100 Greatest Albums of the '80s.

Track listings

US and Japan CD and Cassette (Chrysalis)
The Chrysalis edition of the album features the largest number of tracks, but includes a shorter mix of "Robot Girl" by Dave Dachinger and the Abe Zapp Ruder Version of "11 MPH" instead of the original recording.

International CD and Cassette (Fontana)
Fontana Records' international editions do not feature "Earth to Doris", which was previously released as the b-side of "Robot Girl". The original John Potoker mix of "11 Miles An Hour" appears.

US LP (Chrysalis)
The US LP is a condensed version of the CD, omitting the tracks "Robot Girl", "Wedding Vows in Vegas", and "I Can't Turn You Loose".

International LP (Fontana)
The International LP features the same tracks as the US LP, with the exception of the original John Potoker mix of "11 Miles An Hour" appearing instead and "Earth to Doris" not appearing at all.

Personnel
 David "Michigan-Boy Snake" Was — flute, keyboards, harmonica, vocals
 Don "Rope Drink" Was — bass, keyboards, guitar, mandolin
 Sweet Pea Atkinson — vocals
 Sir Harry Bowens — vocals
 Bruce Nazarian, Dann Huff, Paul Jackson, Jr., Randy Jacobs, Steve "No Wonder" Salas — guitar
 John Patitucci, Marcus Miller, Neil Stubenhaus — bass
 Ron Pangborn, Russ Kunkel, Winston Watson, Yogi Horton — drums
 Aaron Zigman, Al Kooper, Amp Fiddler, Daniel Schroeger, John Van Tongeren, Luis "Louie Restaurant" Resto, Paul Wickens, Robin Smith, Vic Emerson, Martyn Phillips — keyboards
 Alex Acuña, Carl "Butch" Small, David Friendly, Debra Dobkin, Frank Ricotti, Kevin "Guido" Tschirhart, Larry Fratangel, Michael Fisher — percussion
 Bill Reichenbach Jr., Dan Higgins, Kim Hutchcroft, Jerry Hey, Gary Grant, John Thirkell, John Barclay, Guy Barker, Pete Beachill, Phil Todd, Chris "Snake" Davies, Stuart Brooks — brass
 David McMurray, John "Birch" Weiss, Larry Williams — saxophone
 Buddy Childers, Marcus Belgrave, Mark Isham, Oscar Brashear, Rayse Biggs — trumpet
 Arnold McCuller, Arthur "Buster" Marbury, Carol Hall, Coral Gordon, Dee Lewis, Desi Campbell, Donald Ray Mitchell, Geoff Fieger, Sir Harry Bowens, Helen Terry, Juliet Roberts, Kathy Kosins, Pete Steinfeld, Richard Feldstein, Rick Shoemaker, Ruby Turner, Sweet Pea Atkinson — backing vocals
Paul Riser, Richard Niles - string and horn arrangements
 David Bates, Michael Zilkha — Executive Producers
Calli Bucci, Garzelle McDonald, Margaret Mittleman - production co-ordination
Allen Sides, Chris Irwin, Croyden, Dave Dachinger, Don Was, John Potoker, Keven Smith, Lincoln Clapp, Micajah Ryan, Michael H. Brauer, Mike Bosley, Mike Pela, Paul Staveley O'Duffy, Paul Wright, Peter Barker, Phil Da Costa, Roland Herrington, Steve "Barney" Chase, Steve "Dr. Ching" King, Tom O'Leary, Troy Krueger, Martyn Phillips - engineering
David Passick and Ken Kushnick - management

References

1988 albums
Was (Not Was) albums
Albums arranged by Paul Riser
Albums produced by Don Was
Albums produced by David Was
Chrysalis Records albums
Fontana Records albums